"My Love" is a song by American singer-songwriter Lionel Richie. It was released in 1983 as the third and final single from his self-titled debut solo album. The song features harmony backing vocals by country music singer Kenny Rogers. It reached the top 10 on three notable Billboard magazine charts in the spring of 1983: on the pop chart, the song peaked at No. 5; on the Adult Contemporary chart, the song spent four weeks at No. 1; and on the R&B chart, the song topped out at No. 6. "My Love" was not among Richie's more successful singles in the United Kingdom, where it only managed No. 70 on the UK Singles Chart. In Canada, it peaked at No. 28 on the RPM Top 100 Singles chart.

Cash Box described "My Love" as being reminiscent of the Commodores' single "Easy."

A remake of the song was recorded and included on Richie's 2012 album Tuskegee, which features Kenny Chesney.

Charts

Weekly charts

Year-end charts

See also
List of number-one adult contemporary singles of 1983 (U.S.)

References

1983 songs
1983 singles
Lionel Richie songs
Pop ballads
Country ballads
Songs written by Lionel Richie
Motown singles
Song recordings produced by James Anthony Carmichael
Country pop songs
Kenny Rogers songs
1980s ballads
Kenny Chesney songs